This is a list of civil parishes in the ceremonial county of Herefordshire, England. There are 235 civil parishes.

Population figures are unavailable for some of the smallest parishes.

Since the 2011 census: Ross Rural was merged into the Ross-on-Wye civil parish on 1 April 2015 and on the 1st of April 2019 the parishes of Kenderchurch, St Devereux, Treville and Wormbridge were merged with Kilpeck.

See also
 List of civil parishes in England

References

External links
 Office for National Statistics : Geographical Area Listings

Civil parishes
Herefordshire
 
Civil parishes